Svejstrup is a Danish surname. Notable people with the surname include:

Jesper Qualmann Svejstrup (born 1963), Danish biochemist and molecular biologist
Søren Svejstrup (born 1937), Danish diver

Danish-language surnames